Group A of the 2009 FIFA Confederations Cup took place from 15 to 21 June 2009 in Bloemfontein's Free State Stadium, Johannesburg's Ellis Park Stadium, Pretoria's Loftus Versfeld Stadium and Rustenburg's Royal Bafokeng Stadium. The group consisted of defending champions Brazil, Egypt, Italy, and the United States.

Standings

Matches

Brazil vs Egypt

United States vs Italy

United States vs Brazil

Egypt vs Italy

Italy vs Brazil

Egypt vs United States

References

External links
 

Group B
Group
Group
Italy at the 2009 FIFA Confederations Cup
2008–09 in Egyptian football